MVA85A (modified vaccinia Ankara 85A) is a vaccine against tuberculosis developed by researchers led by Professor Helen McShane at Oxford University. This vaccine produces higher levels of long-lasting cellular immunity when used together with the older TB vaccine BCG. Phase I clinical trials were completed and then phase II clinical trials took place in South Africa. Efficacy trials ran in parallel from 2009 to 2019.

Results released in February 2013, were described as "disappointing", showing only a statistically insignificant prevention rate in infants.

Results published in 2015, cast doubt on the efficacy of the vaccine.

In 2018, a BMJ investigation raised concerns about the ethics of an efficacy trial in South African infants, particularly because of results from earlier animal trials such as a study with macaques at Porton Down. One response argued that 14 prior human trials showed a safety signal, that regulators were aware of the primate trial and decided to continue, and that three subsequent investigations found no evidence of wrong-doing. Another response by Ian Orme questioned the critique of animal models.

References

External links
 New TB vaccine shown to be safe

Tuberculosis vaccines